Alexandra Kunová (born 1 November 1992) is a Slovak former competitive figure skater. She is the 2011 Slovak national champion.

Programs

Results 
CS: Challenger Series (began in the 2014–15 season); JGP: Junior Grand Prix

References

External links 

 
 Alexandra Kunova at sport-folio.net
 Alexandra Kunova at Tracings

1992 births
Slovak female single skaters
Living people
Figure skaters from Bratislava
Competitors at the 2015 Winter Universiade
Competitors at the 2013 Winter Universiade